This is a list of works by the English historical novelist William Harrison Ainsworth (1805–1882).

Novels

Other works
 December Tales. London: G. & W. B. Whittaker, 1823
 The Combat of the Thirty: From a Breton lay of the fourteenth century; with an introduction, comprising a new chapter of Froissart. London: Chapman & Hall, 1859

References

Citations

Bibliography

Carver, Stephen James (2003) "Ainsworth, William Harrison" in: The Life and Works of the Lancashire Novelist William Harrison Ainsworth 1805–1882.  Edwin Mellen Press
Ellis, S. M. (1911) William Harrison Ainsworth and his Friends. 2 vols. John Lane. ("Bibliography of the works of William Harrison Ainsworth": v. 2, p. 345-383)
Locke, Harold (1925) A Bibliographical Catalogue of the Published Novels and Ballads of William Harrison Ainsworth. Elkin Mathews

External links

Online works by Ainsworth, at the Online Books site: http://onlinebooks.library.upenn.edu/webbin/book/lookupname?key=Ainsworth%2c%20William%20Harrison%2c%201805%2d1882&c=x

Bibliographies by writer
Bibliographies of British writers
Bibliographies of historical novels